"A New Day" is a single by English post-punk band Killing Joke. It was released by E.G. Records in July 1984 as a 7-inch and 12-inch single. The B-side to the 7" release was a remix of the song, named "Dance Day". The single reached No. 51 in the UK Singles Chart. A promotional video was filmed for the song, the first time the band made a video for a non-album single.

The song was later included on the 2008 reissue of Night Time. "Dance Day" was later included on the compilation "Wilful Days" (mistakenly titled "A New Day").

Track listings 
The 7-inch single featured "Dance Day" as the B-side. The 12" single featured a dub mix of "A New Day" as its A-side and the original track as the B-side. A 7" release in Portugal used a shorter edit of "A New Day" instead.

7" vinyl single 
Side A
 "A New Day" – 04:08

Side B
 "Dance Day" – 03:40

12" vinyl single 
Side A
 "A New Day (Dub Mix)" – 04:20

Side B
 "A New Day" – 04:08

Charts

References

External links 
 

1984 songs
Killing Joke songs
Song recordings produced by Chris Kimsey
E.G. Records singles
Songs written by Jaz Coleman
Songs written by Geordie Walker
Songs written by Paul Raven (musician)
Songs written by Paul Ferguson